Kilza Setti de Castro Lima (born 26 January 1932) is a Brazilian ethnomusicologist, composer, and pianist.

Biography
Kilza Setti was born in São Paulo, Brazil. She started her studies on piano with Leonilda Morganti and at age of 8 she started piano classes with Fructuoso Vianna. In 1953 she graduated from the Conservatorio Dramatico y Musical of São Paulo where she studied composition with Camargo Guarnieri, and won scholarships for study in composition and research in ethnomusic at the Instituto Di Tella in Buenos Aires. She also earned a scholarship to the Calouste Gulbenkian Foundation in Lisbon, Portugal, where she studied under anthropologist Michel Giacometti and composer Fernando Lopes Graça.

Setti graduated from the University of São Paulo in 1982 with a doctorate degree in social anthropology. She studied the music of the European-and Indian-born fishermen on the southeastern coast of Brazil and the ritual music of the Guarani-Mbyá and Timbira Indians of Central Brazil, and founded the Brazilian Association of Folklore.

Setti received awards for her compositions, including first prize in the composition competitions. She is a visiting professor at the Federal University of Bahia and other universities.

In 1999 Kilza’s musical work was subject to two researches: a doctoral thesis in the University of Boston, USA, by cellist Darylin Manring; and a master’s dissertation in the State University of Campinas (Unicamp), by pianist Nancy Bueno.

Works
Kilza Setti is influenced by her study of folkloric music and composes for orchestra, chamber ensemble, solo instrument and voice. Selected works include:
1958 Dois Corais mistos: Obialá Koro Yemanjá Oto	
1959 Balada do Rei the Sereias	
1973 Poesia II	
1982 Canoa em dois tempos	
1982 Ser	
1982 Memória	
1962 Lenda do céu	
1972 Lundu	
1973 Jogo da Condessa	
1990 Missa Caiçara	
1955 Toada for piano
1958 Seis Peças em clave de Sol for piano
1972 Dois momentos for recorder
1958 Toada for orchestra
1961 Suíte for string orchestra, piccolo, flute, clarinet
1966 Folgança suite for orchestra
1999 Meditação sobre o Tietê

Her works have been recorded and issued on CD. She is the author of a book titled Voices of the Green Hell - Disenchanted Amazonia, 2003, .

References

1932 births
Living people
20th-century classical composers
20th-century women composers
Brazilian classical composers
Women classical composers
Brazilian music educators
Women music educators